Steve Ray Baylark (born July 28, 1983) is a former American football running back. He was signed by the Arizona Cardinals as an undrafted free agent in 2007. He went to high school at Apopka High School and played college football at the University of Massachusetts Amherst. Baylark is a member of the UMass Athletics Hall of Fame.

Baylark was also a member of the Denver Broncos and Sacramento Mountain Lions.

College career
Baylark played college football at UMass from 2003 to 2006. He was only the third player to rush for 1,000 yards in four consecutive seasons in the history of I-AA football. As a senior in 2006, Baylark rushed for 1,960 yards and 15 touchdowns on the way to a National Championship Game appearance. He was named the 2006 Atlantic 10 Co-Offensive Player of the Year and also earned All-American honors. He participated in the 82nd Annual East-West Shrine Game as a member of the East squad which was coached by Don Shula.

References

External links
Just Sports Stats
Arizona Cardinals bio
Denver Broncos bio
UMass Minutemen bio

1983 births
Living people
People from Aberdeen, Mississippi
Players of American football from Mississippi
American football running backs
UMass Minutemen football players
Arizona Cardinals players
Denver Broncos players
Sacramento Mountain Lions players